Thomas Anthony Bickle is a British/Swiss microbiologist.

Life 
Thomas A. Bickle studied biology at the University of Geneva. He completed his doctorate in 1972 at the University of California at Davis and subsequently worked there as an assistant. The following year he moved to the Biozentrum at the University of Basel on an EMBO Long-Term Fellowship. Here he was appointed in 1980 to associate professor and in 1990 to full professor. In addition to his duties in research and teaching, he served as Chairman of the Biozentrum and as Dean of the Faculty of Science. He reached emeritus status in 2005.

Work 

Thomas A. Bickle mainly investigated the mode of action of bacterial DNA restriction and modification systems. These systems protect bacteria from being invaded by foreign DNA, either free or packaged in bacterial viruses. So-called restriction enzymes (endonucleases) recognize foreign DNA and inactivate these through endonucleolytic cleavage. In Escherichia coli Bickle elucidated the precise method used by these enzymes to distinguish between their own and foreign DNA, He identified the DNA recognition sequences of various restriction enzymes and investigated their structure. Furthermore, he demonstrated that many bacterial viruses have evolved diverse defense mechanisms to avoid restriction.

Awards and honors 
1980 elected Member of the European Molecular Biology Organization (EMBO)  
1985 member of the Swiss Commission for Molecular Biology

External links 
Webpage Biozentrum University of Basel, Emeriti
Researchgate: Thomas Bickle
Swiss National Science Foundation, P3 database, Thomas Bickle
Google Books, Thomas A. Bickle, Markus Streiff: Methods for Purification of Restriction Enzymes

References 

Living people
Microbiologists
University of California, Davis alumni
University of Geneva alumni
Biozentrum University of Basel
Year of birth missing (living people)